Shailene Diann Woodley (born November 15, 1991) is an American actress. Born in San Bernardino, California, Woodley was raised in Simi Valley, and started modeling at the age of four and began acting professionally in minor television roles. She first gained prominence for her starring role as Amy Juergens in the ABC Family teen drama series The Secret Life of the American Teenager (2008–2013). She subsequently starred in the films The Descendants (2011) and The Spectacular Now (2013), receiving a nomination for her first Golden Globe Award for the former.

Woodley achieved wider recognition for her starring role as a teenaged cancer patient in the romantic drama The Fault in Our Stars (2014) and as Beatrice Prior in the science-fiction trilogy The Divergent Series (2014–2016). She played a sexual assault survivor in the HBO drama series Big Little Lies (2017–2019), for which she was nominated for a Golden Globe Award and a Primetime Emmy Award. She has since played supporting roles in the films Snowden (2016), The Mauritanian (2021) and The Fallout (2021), and starred in Adrift (2018) and The Last Letter from Your Lover (2021).

Woodley is also an environmental activist and serves as a board member of the political action committee, Our Revolution.

Early life 
Woodley was raised in Simi Valley, California. Both her parents are psychologists. Her mother, Lori (née Victor), is a middle school counselor, and her father, Lonnie Woodley, a former school principal, is a family therapist. She has a younger brother, Tanner.

At the age of five, Woodley began working in commercials, appearing in more than forty TV spots, including advertisements for Leapfrog, Hertz and a Honda minivan. She told Hollywood Reporter that her parents only agreed to allow her to work professionally if she promised to adhere to three rules: "I had to stay the person they knew I was; have fun; and do good in school". Woodley was a 4.0 student, who took AP classes and graduated at Simi Valley High School. She also took acting classes from Anthony Meindl.

At fifteen, she was diagnosed with scoliosis and was put in a chest-to-hips plastic brace for two years. Woodley told Us Weekly that "It's like wearing a tacky, disgusting, plastic corset for 18 hours a day. In the beginning, it was hard to eat or breathe. And I had to give up cross-country running. But I needed to have it to realign my spine".

Career

1999–2010: Career beginnings and Secret Life 

Woodley began her acting career in 1999 with a minor role in the television film Replacing Dad. She went on to feature in minor television roles in The District and Crossing Jordan (in the latter, she portrayed the 10-year-old version of Jill Hennessy's title character). She followed with a leading role in the television film A Place Called Home (2004) as California Ford, which earned her a nomination for a Young Artist Award for Best Leading Young Actress in a TV Movie, Miniseries or Special. She also originally played the young Kaitlin Cooper in The O.C. She appeared as the titular character Felicity Merriman in the television film Felicity: An American Girl Adventure (2005). Her performance received another Young Artist Award nomination, this time for Best Performance in a TV Movie, Miniseries, or Special (Comedy or Drama). Following this, Woodley appeared in numerous guest roles in other television series, including Everybody Loves Raymond, My Name is Earl, CSI: NY, Close to Home, and Cold Case.

Woodley was then cast as the main character, Amy Juergens, in the ABC Family series The Secret Life of the American Teenager (2008–2013), about a 15-year-old girl who learns she is pregnant. The show explores the effects of her pregnancy on her family, friends, and herself, as well as life at Grant High School. Ken Tucker of Entertainment Weekly praised her performance, stating, "[It] lifts a well-meaning, rather brave, but ramshackle show a notch." Popular among viewers, the show became one of ABC Family's most-watched telecasts throughout its five-season run, spanning over 121 episodes.

2011–2014: Film debut and breakthrough 
In 2011, Woodley made her feature film debut in Alexander Payne's The Descendants, where she played Alex, the troubled elder daughter of Matt King (played by George Clooney). Her performance received positive reviews from critics. A. O. Scott from The New York Times said, "Ms. Woodley [gives] one of the toughest, smartest, most credible adolescent performances in recent memory." Peter Debruge from Variety said that her performance is a "revelation" and that "in the role of Alex, [she is] displaying both the edge and depth the role demands." Following accolades for her performance, Woodley received a Golden Globe nomination for Best Supporting Actress – Motion Picture, and won the Independent Spirit Award for Best Supporting Female. Consequently, she was awarded the Trophée Chopard at the 2012 Cannes Film Festival and the 2012 Santa Barbara International Film Festival Virtuosos Award.

People named her one of 2012's "Most Beautiful at Every Age." Woodley was also considered one of the 55 faces of the future by Nylon "Young Hollywood Issue". She also received the Emerging Star Spotlight Award at Elle's 20th Annual "Women In Hollywood".

Woodley starred in the film adaptation of Tim Tharp's novel, The Spectacular Now, as Aimee Finecky, an innocent, bookish teenager who begins dating the charming, freewheeling high-school senior (Miles Teller). The film premiered at Sundance on January 18, 2013. Her portrayal of Aimee garnered much praise; Los Angeles Times''' critic Betsy Sharkey said that Woodley and Teller "bring such an authentic face of confidence and questioning, indifference and need, pain and denial, friendship and first love," while another critic from The Guardian said that they gave "remarkably strong performances" that "display a depth of feeling that's breathtaking in its simplicity and honest[y]." Additionally, Woodley won the Special Jury Award for Acting, alongside Teller, at the 2013 Sundance Film Festival and received a nomination for the Independent Spirit Award for Best Female Lead.

In October 2012,  Woodley was offered the role of Mary Jane Watson in The Amazing Spider-Man 2. On June 19, 2013,  she was cut from the film. Director Marc Webb told The Hollywood Reporter that the cut was "a creative decision to streamline the story and focus on Peter and Gwen and their relationship," and that everyone loved working with Woodley.

She had also signed on to star in White Bird in a Blizzard, directed by Gregg Araki. Although filming took place in October 2012, the film was not released until January 20, 2014, at the Sundance Film Festival and then on October 24, 2014, to wider audiences, where it received mixed reviews. In the film, she plays teenager Katrina "Kat" Connors, whose life is thrown into chaos when her mother disappears. Critic Moira MacDonald commended her by saying, "Woodley's depiction of Kat is low-key, natural, and utterly unaffected; as she has in every role, she makes the character her own, with her scratchy little voice and level gaze."

In 2014, Woodley starred as Beatrice "Tris" Prior in the film Divergent, an adaptation of Veronica Roth's best-selling young-adult novel of the same name, and the first installment in The Divergent Series. Set in a dystopian and postapocalyptic Chicago, the film received mixed reviews, but Woodley's performance as Tris received a positive reception; Sam Allard from Orlando Weekly said, "with her performance as Tris Prior in Divergent, Woodley rescues and then raises up a film that could have been an utter disaster." Divergent reached the number-one spot at the box office during its opening weekend, and was a financial success.

Also in 2014, Woodley starred as Hazel Grace Lancaster in The Fault in Our Stars, the film adaptation of John Green's novel of the same name. She portrayed a 16-year-old cancer patient who meets and falls in love with Augustus Waters (Ansel Elgort, who also played her brother in the Divergent series), a similarly afflicted teen from her cancer support group. Green said via Twitter about Woodley; "There were so many amazing auditions for the role of Hazel, but Shailene's love for the book and her understanding of Hazel blew me away." The film was a blockbuster success, grossing over $307 million worldwide. Woodley's performance received critical acclaim; Peter Travers in Rolling Stone called her a "sublime actress with a résumé that pretty much proves she's incapable of making a false move on camera", and Richard Roeper of Chicago Sun-Times called her performance as Hazel Oscar-worthy, adding, "she's that memorable". On November 14, 2014, she received The Hollywood Film Award for Hollywood Breakout Performance – Actress for her depiction of Hazel.

Given her career breakthrough and continuing success since her film debut, she earned a nomination for the BAFTA Rising Star Award in 2015. 

 2015–present: Further film and television work 

In 2015, Woodley reprised her role as Tris in The Divergent Series: Insurgent, the second installment in The Divergent Series. Her performance once again received critical acclaim, with Daniel M. Kimmel of New England Movies Weekly writing, "Woodley does solid work here as she's done elsewhere, and continues to be someone to watch." Despite a more negative critical reception than the previous film, Insurgent was commercially successful, making nearly $100 million in its worldwide debut and grossed $295.2 million worldwide. She reprised her role again in the penultimate film of the series Allegiant (2016). The film, however, was poorly reviewed by critics and a box-office bomb. Lionsgate had planned for the final film in the series to be made for television, but Woodley announced that she would not be a part of it.

She next starred opposite Joseph Gordon-Levitt in Oliver Stone's biographical thriller Snowden (2016), in which Gordon-Levitt portrayed Edward Snowden.  Owen Gleiberman's review said that Woodley "gives a performance of breathtaking dimension: As the movie goes on, she makes Lindsay supportive and selfish, loving and stricken."

Starting in 2015, Woodley took a break from filming for nearly a year and considered quitting as an actor, stating in a later interview that she "had hit a wall with acting" and "felt it was time to do something different". But she eventually "fell in love" with acting again through Big Little Lies. In 2017, Woodley starred as a sexual assault survivor, alongside Nicole Kidman and Reese Witherspoon, in the HBO critically acclaimed drama series Big Little Lies directed by Jean-Marc Vallée. Sarah Rense of Esquire called Woodley's performance "underrated" and "brought a quiet complexity", adding that "she was the most realistic character" and her "cool demeanor interrupted by sudden, short outbursts - just seemed so real to anyone who thinks more than they talk". She was nominated for an Emmy and Golden Globe Award for Best Supporting Actress in a Limited Series or Movie and Best Performance by an Actress in a Supporting Role in a Series, Limited Series or Motion Picture Made for Television respectively for her role.  She reprised her role as Jane Chapman for the second season in 2019. 

She also starred in and produced the biographical film Adrift (2018), with Baltasar Kormákur as director. Woodley learned sailing and did her own stunts on the film, ninety percent of which was shot on the open ocean off Fiji. Daniel Feingold from WSVN called her performance as Tami Oldham Ashcraft, a real-life sailor who was stranded at sea after a storm, "Oscar-worthy". Owen Gleiberman of Variety called her "a sensual actress", stating that she "has the gift of making sensuality dramatic; there's a beautiful severity to her features that allows you to feel the things she's showing you. That's a talent, but it's also an instinct". Woodley was awarded the Rising Star Award during the 2018 Deauville Film Festival.

In 2019, Woodley starred in the romantic drama Endings, Beginnings alongside Sebastian Stan, Jamie Dornan, and Matthew Gray Gubler. In 2021, she starred in the real-life Guantanamo Bay drama film The Mauritanian alongside Jodie Foster, Tahar Rahim and Benedict Cumberbatch and also had a small supporting role in the critically acclaimed film The Fallout. She also starred in and executive produced the romantic drama film The Last Letter from Your Lover alongside Felicity Jones, based on the bestselling book by Jojo Moyes.

 Upcoming projects 
She will next star in Misanthrope, an upcoming thriller centered on a talented but troubled cop who is recruited by the FBI to help profile and track down a serial killer. The film is set to be directed by Damián Szifron. Woodley will also serve as a producer on the film. She will star in the thriller Panopticon with Anthony Mackie and Jacob Latimore, which began filming in New Mexico in summer 2021. She joined Jack Whitehall in the upcoming comedy film  Robots, which was slated to begin filming in New Mexico in August 2021. She is set to star in the upcoming Showtime hourlong drama series Three Women, based on the award-winning and bestselling book by Lisa Taddeo. Filming was set to begin in Fall 2021. She was also cast in Girl Named Sue, a film based on the true story of Sue Webber-Brown, a DEA agent who created the Drug Endangered Children (DEC) protocol. She joined Shia LaBeouf and Robert De Niro in the upcoming crime drama After Exile, with Joshua Michael Stern as director. In November 2020, she joined The Fence, a political satire film that will reunite her with Miles Teller for their fifth film. The film will be directed by Grímur Hákonarson. She will also star in the animated feature film Scarygirl, as well as in the romance film No Baggage, which are in pre-production and development respectively.  She is also attached to portray Lina Lardi, mistress of Ferrari founder Enzo Ferrari, in Michael Mann's biopic Ferrari. She also joined the ensemble cast of Craig Gillespie's Dumb Money.

 Personal life 
In 2018, Woodley confirmed she was dating Australian-Fijian rugby union player Ben Volavola.  In an interview with The Hollywood Reporter, she said: "I fall in love with human beings based on who they are, not based on what they do or what sex they are". In April 2020, the relationship with Volavola reportedly ended.

Woodley was reported to be in a relationship with NFL quarterback Aaron Rodgers in 2020.  In February 2021, Rodgers referred to his "fiancée" during his acceptance speech for the league's MVP award at the NFL Honors ceremony, confirming that he was engaged, but not to whom. Woodley confirmed she was engaged to Rodgers in a February 22, 2021 appearance on The Tonight Show Starring Jimmy Fallon. In February 2022, it was reported that Woodley and Rodgers had ended their engagement.

 Activism

Woodley is an avid environmental activist and climate advocate. In 2010, she and her mother co-founded the nonprofit organization All it Takes, a youth leadership program that aims to educate young people to practice empathy, compassion, responsibility, and purpose in hopes to foster sustainable, positive change for themselves, others and the environment. She received the Philanthropy Award at Variety's fourth Annual Power of Youth event for the significant contributions made by All it Takes.

She supported and campaigned for Bernie Sanders for president in 2016. To keep the momentum going, she organized the Up To Us movement, a cross country caravan to the Democratic National Convention. Its goal is to unite the people of the country (USA) in an act of solidarity to raise awareness on the political, social and environmental issues, the political candidates need to address leading up to the elections.

In 2016, Woodley protested against the Dakota Access Pipeline, an underground petroleum transport pipeline. In October, she was arrested for criminal trespassing in Saint Anthony, North Dakota. The arrest was broadcast as it happened on Woodley's own Facebook Live. She reportedly posted bail for her and the 26 other protestors and was, subsequently, released.  Ten days after her arrest, she authored a piece for Time, titled "The Truth About My Arrest", detailing her experience and raising awareness for the environmental and social issues surrounding the cause. She then pleaded guilty and was sentenced to a year of probation.

In mid-2016, Woodley joined the board of Our Revolution, a political organization aimed to educate voters about issues, get people involved in the political process, support progressive policies such as Medicare for All, and work to organize and elect progressive leaders.  As a member of the organization and a known environmental activist, Woodley became one of the speakers at a National Town Hall in 2018, titled "Solving Our Climate Crisis", hosted by Our Revolution founder Bernie Sanders. The event addressed the global threat of climate change and explored possible solutions to save the Earth and create good-paying jobs. 

On September 29, 2016, Woodley was honored at the 20th Anniversary Global Green Environmental Awards, receiving the Entertainment Industry Environmental Leadership Award for co-founding All it Takes. In October 2016, she was given the Female EMA Futures Award during the 26th Annual Environmental Media Association (EMA) Awards. She also received the Advocate Award at the 2016 InStyle Awards, for her work in uplifting others and championing those in need. In 2017, the environmental organization Sierra Club honored Woodley at their 125th Anniversary Trail Blazers Ball, for her grassroots activism.

Woodley has expressed her insistence on clean and renewable energy. In 2017, she wrote an opinion piece for The Hill, titled "US Should Run on Renewable Energy by 2050", encouraging Americans to support the technology and the need to transition to an economy powered by 100% clean energy sources. It ultimately gave her the opportunity to introduce the 100 by '50 Act, a bill that calls for the United States to aggressively reduce carbon pollution and achieve 100% clean and renewable energy by 2050, sponsored by Senator Jeff Merkley.  In 2019, she supported Indigenized Energy, a local nonprofit that brings solar energy and jobs to Native Americans. The organization was created by Woodley's fellow Dakota Access Pipeline Protest activist, Cody Two Bears.

In 2018, Woodley took activist Calina Lawrence to the 75th Golden Globe Awards as her guest. They had met at Standing Rock while protesting the Dakota Access Pipeline.

Woodley has lent her voice to several environmental campaigns such as the Conservation International's Nature Is Speaking series, focusing on its goal to reframe why conservation is important and personify different aspects of nature. She is also a member of Conservation International's Leadership Council, dedicated to advancing the organization's mission through each member's expertise, community connections, and philanthropic support. She also teamed up with American Express, together with Parley for the Oceans,  on their #BackourOceans initiative to combat marine plastic pollution.  She also joined Ocean Unite's 30x30 mission to protect at least 30% of the Earth's oceans by 2030  and the WILDOCEANS's Ocean Impact, promoting the conservation of South Africa's oceans. 

In July 2019, Woodley became an Oceans Ambassador for Greenpeace and embarked on a three-week-long expedition to the Sargasso Sea to study the impact of plastics and microplastics on marine life, and to document the importance of this unique ecosystem for protection under a new global ocean treaty that is being negotiated at the United Nations. She wrote a piece for Time, titled "How I'm Changing My Life to Help Save the Seas", chronicling the time she spent on the Greenpeace ship and the actions to take to save the marine life.

In 2020, Woodley partnered with Karün, a certified B Corp that creates high-quality eyewear using recycled waste like fishing nets, ropes, and metals collected by local rural entrepreneurs. Their collaboration created the product line Karün by Shailene Woodley'', building its identity around the connection of product design with nature protection. It was awarded The Most Sustainable Eyewear Brand in 2021 and 2022 by Global Brands Magazine Awards.

In 2022, Woodley became inaugural member of GoodLeap's Advisory Council, which brings renowned experience from a variety of sectors, to help GoodLeap continue its exponential growth and mission to connect a world where everyone can live more sustainably.

Filmography

Film

Television

Music videos

Video games

Accolades

References

External links 

 

1991 births
Living people
20th-century American actresses
21st-century American actresses
Activists from California
Actors from San Bernardino, California
Actresses from Greater Los Angeles
American child actresses
American environmentalists
American film actresses
American people of Creole descent
American people of English descent
American people of Swiss-German descent
American television actresses
American women environmentalists
Independent Spirit Award for Best Supporting Female winners
People from Simi Valley, California
Chopard Trophy for Female Revelation winners